Shara-Azarga is a rural locality (an ulus) in Zakamensky District, Republic of Buryatia, Russia. The population was 628 as of 2010. There are 7 streets.

Geography 
Shara-Azarga is located 38 km northwest of Zakamensk (the district's administrative centre) by road. Yengorboy is the nearest rural locality.

References 

Rural localities in Zakamensky District